Gary Lee (born July 19, 1947) is an American politician and healthcare executive. He is a member of the North Dakota State Senate from the 22nd District, serving since 2001. He is a member of the Republican party.

Early life and education 
Lee was born in Fargo, North Dakota and raised in Casselton, North Dakota. He served as a Specialist in the United States Army during the Vietnam War. Lee attended the North Dakota School of Respiratory Care before earning a Bachelor of Arts from North Dakota State University.

Career 
Lee has served as the manager of Respiratory Care Service at Merit Care Health System since 1975. He also worked as the Director of Sanford Health.

References

1947 births
21st-century American politicians
Living people
North Dakota State University alumni
Presidents pro tempore of the North Dakota Senate
Republican Party North Dakota state senators
Politicians from Fargo, North Dakota
University of Mary alumni